In the United Kingdom, caretaker ministry may refer to the following short-lived British caretaker governments:

 1757 caretaker ministry
 Wellington caretaker ministry (1834)
 Salisbury caretaker ministry (1885–1886)
 Churchill caretaker ministry (1945)